Tuatara are a species of reptiles endemic to New Zealand.

Tuatara may also refer to:

 Mount Tuatara, summit of the Churchill Mountains in Antarctica
 Chris Tuatara-Morrison (born 1986, as Chris Tuatara), Australian rugby player
 Tuatara (comics), a DC Comics character
 Auckland Tuatara, a New Zealand professional baseball club
 Tuatara (band), a Seattle-based instrumental music group
 Tuatara (album), by artists on New Zealand-based Flying Nun Records
 SSC Tuatara, an automobile
 Tuatara Games, video game developer, see List of Xbox One games (A–L)
 The Tuatara (book) by Brian Parkinson, see Storylines Children's Literature Foundation of New Zealand Notable Books List
 Tuatara (company), a Polish based company
 Auckland Tuatara (basketball), semi-professional basketball team from New Zealand

See also